Gourbeyrella romanowskii is a species of beetle in the family Cerambycidae. It was described by Fleutiaux and Salle in 1889.

References

Tillomorphini
Beetles described in 1889